Kendasampige is a 2015 Indian Kannada thriller film directed by Duniya Soori and written by Surendranath. It stars newcomers Santhosh Reva (Vikky Varun) and Manvitha Harish in the lead roles, making their debuts with the film. Rajesh Nataranga, Prakash Belawadi and Chandrika feature in supporting roles. The film is a sequel to forthcoming film Kaage Bangara. The plot which is centered on a couple who are framed in a case of crime and are on a run from police, exposes the nexus between the latter and the influential. The road drama was praised for bringing forth a dirty web of drug trade, the mafia, corrupt police officials and a questionable judicial system.  The movie is based on a 1996 story by writer Surendranath.

Produced under the banner Parimala Film Factory, the cinematography for the film was done by Satya Hegde and was edited by Deepu S. Kumar. V. Harikrishna composed the film score and the soundtrack.

On 18 December 2015 Kendasampige completed 100 Days run in 5 theaters. Director Soori had initially announced that the film will have a prequel titled Kaage Bangara and a sequel titled Black Magic. But Kaage Bangara was stalled owing to demonetization since the director felt that the storyline he prepared was no more relevant after issue of new currency notes. However, he revived  Kaage Bangara after the 2020 movie Popcorn Monkey Tiger which served as a link between Kendasampige and Kaage Bangara.

Plot
The plot revolves around Ravindra, who works in the company of Shakuntala Shetty, as an attendant. Circumstance arises where Gowri Shetty, who is Shakuntala's daughter gets attracted to Ravindra, who reciprocates her feelings. However, Ravindra is booked in a drug related case where he unknowingly kills a cop and escapes. While on the run, Ravi informs Gowri about the incident, where she not only helps Ravindra with money but also accompanies him through the journey. ACP S. Purandar investigates the incident and realizes that the cop had faked his death under the orders of DCP Suryakanth, along with Shakuntala Shetty. Ravi and Gowri move to many cities day by day, after they are traced by dirty cops. Purandar tracks down the couple, where he drags Ravi and shoots him, Gowri is devastated and returns home. After the incident, Purandar reveals that he faked Ravi's death and sent him to Mumbai as a bar supplier after he revealed everything about Shakuntala's involvement with dirty cops to kill him. At Mumbai, Ravi calls up Gowri and reveals about his existence to Gowri, who feels happy for him.

Cast

 Vikky Varun as Ravindra "Ravi" 
 Manvitha Harish as Gowri Shetty
 Rajesh Nataranga as ACP S. Purandar
 Prakash Belawadi as DCP Suryakanth
 Chandrika as Shakuntala Shetty
 Sheethal Shetty
 Shwetha Pandit as Mangalore drug lord Nisha
 Prashanth Siddi as Haav Rani
 Chandrashekar S.
 Narayana Swamy
 Kishore Nittur
 Nandagopal
 Sathyamurthy
 Vijaykumar
 Muralidhar Karanth
 Bhanuprakash
 Sudheer Urs
 Master Prithvi
 Sudhi
 Vidya Kulakarni
 Kiran
 Shamanth
 Sridhar Iyengar
 Manju Prabhas
 Prashanth Mysore
 Vinoda Sri
 Ramya Vijaykumar
 Sujay 
 Kemparaj Dasappa
 Manju
 Kumar
 Abhilasha

Soundtrack

V. Harikrishna composed the film score and the soundtrack for the film, lyrics for which was penned by Jayant Kaikini and Yogaraj Bhat. The soundtrack album consists of four tracks. The album was launched on 26 July 2015 in Bangalore in the presence of Soori's forthcoming film Doddmane Hudga team, including actors Puneeth Rajkumar and Radhika Pandit. Actors V. Ravichandran and Duniya Vijay were other invitees.

Track listing

References

External links
 kendasampige website : ಕೆಂಡಸಂಪಿಗೆ | ಇದು ಭಾವಾಲಾಪಗಳ ಸುರಿಮಳೆ
 
Soori Silently Finishes First Schedule of Kendasampige

2015 thriller films
2010s Kannada-language films
Indian thriller films
Films scored by V. Harikrishna
Indian road movies
Films directed by Duniya Soori
2010s road movies